Baladiyat Al-Nasiriya Sport Club, is an Iraqi football team based in Al-Nasiriyah, Dhi Qar, that plays in Iraq Division Two.

Managerial history

  Salem Jamil
  Jalil Ibrahim

See also 
 2018–19 Iraq FA Cup
 2019–20 Iraq FA Cup
 2021–22 Iraq FA Cup

References

External links
 Baladiyat Al-Nasiriya SC on Goalzz.com
 Iraq Clubs- Foundation Dates

2013 establishments in Iraq
Association football clubs established in 2013
Football clubs in Dhi Qar